Native American cultures across the United States are notable for their wide variety and diversity of lifestyles, regalia, art forms and beliefs. The culture of indigenous North America is usually defined by the concept of the Pre-Columbian culture area, namely a geographical region where shared cultural traits occur. The northwest culture area, for example shared common traits such as salmon fishing, woodworking, large villages or towns and a hierarchical social structure.

Though cultural features, language, clothing, and customs vary enormously from one tribe to another, there are certain elements which are encountered frequently and shared by many tribes. Early European American scholars described the Native Americans as having a society dominated by clans.

European colonization of the Americas had a major impact on Native American culture through what is known as the Columbian exchange. The Columbian exchange, also known as the Columbian interchange, was the widespread transfer of plants, animals, culture, human populations, technology, and ideas between the Americas and the Old World in the 15th and 16th centuries, following Christopher Columbus's 1492 voyage. The Columbian exchange generally had a destructive impact on Native American culture through disease, and a 'clash of cultures', whereby European values of private property, the family, and labor led to conflict, appropriation of traditional communal lands and slavery.

In the early years, as these native peoples encountered European explorers and settlers and engaged in trade, they exchanged food, crafts, and furs for blankets, iron and steel implements, horses, trinkets, firearms, and alcoholic beverages.
Today, while remaining faithful to their traditions, Native American cultures continue to evolve and adapt to changing circumstances.

Cultural areas
Native Americans in the United States fall into a number of distinct ethno-linguistic and territorial phyla, whose only uniting characteristic is that they were in a stage of either Mesolithic (hunter-gatherer) or Neolithic (subsistence farming) culture at the time of European contact.

They can be classified as belonging to a number of large cultural areas:
Continental U.S.
Californian tribes (Northern): Yok-Utian, Pacific Coast Athabaskan, Coast Miwok, Yurok, Palaihnihan, Chumashan, Uto-Aztecan
Plateau tribes: Interior Salish, Plateau Penutian
Great Basin tribes: Uto-Aztecan
Pacific Northwest Coast: Pacific Coast Athabaskan, Coast Salish, Wakashan
Southwestern tribes: Uto-Aztecan, Yuman, Southern Athabaskan
Plains Indians: Siouan, Plains Algonquian, Southern Athabaskan
Northeastern Woodlands tribes: Lenape, Pequot, Mohican, Mohawk, Iroquoian, Central Algonquian, Eastern Algonquian
Southeastern Woodlands tribes: Muskogean, Caddoan, Catawban, Iroquoian 
Alaska Natives 
Arctic: Eskimo–Aleut
Subarctic: Northern Athabaskan
Hawaiians

Language

There are approximately 296 spoken (or formerly spoken) indigenous languages north of Mexico, 269 of which are grouped into 29 families.

The major ethno-linguistic phyla are:
Na-Dene languages,
Iroquoian languages,
Caddoan languages
Algonquian languages
Algic languages,
Siouan–Catawban languages,
Uto-Aztecan languages,
Salishan languages,
Tanoan languages
Eskimo–Aleut (Alaska)

The Na-Dené, Algic, and Uto-Aztecan families are the largest in terms of number of languages. Uto-Aztecan has the most speakers (1.95 million) if the languages in Mexico are considered (mostly due to 1.5 million speakers of Nahuatl); Na-Dené comes in second with approximately 200,000 speakers (nearly 180,000 of these are speakers of Navajo), and Algic in third with about 180,000 speakers (mainly Cree and Ojibwe). Na-Dené and Algic have the widest geographic distributions: Algic currently spans from northeastern Canada across much of the continent down to northeastern Mexico (due to later migrations of the Kickapoo) with two outliers in California (Yurok and Wiyot). The remaining 27 languages are either isolates or unclassified), such as Penutian languages, Hokan, Gulf languages and others.

Organization

Gens structure
Early European American scholar described the Native Americans (as well as any other tribal society) as having a society dominated by clans or gentes (in the Roman model) before tribes were formed. There were some common characteristics:
The right to elect its sachem and chiefs.
The right to depose its sachem and chiefs.
The obligation not to marry in the gens.
Mutual rights of inheritance of the property of deceased members.
Reciprocal obligations of help, defense, and redress of injuries.
The right to bestow names on its members.
The right to adopt strangers into the gens.
Common religious rights, query.
A common burial place.
A council of the gens.

Tribal structure
Subdivision and differentiation took place between various groups. Some functions and attributes of tribes are:

The possession of the gentes.
The right to depose these sachems and chiefs.
The possession of religious faith and worship.
A supreme government consisting of a council of chiefs.
A head-chief of the tribe in some instances.

Traditional diet 

The traditional diet of Native Americans has historically consisted of a combination of agriculture, hunting, and the gathering of wild foods, variable by bioregion. 

Post-contact, European settlers in the northeastern region of the Americas observed that some of the Indigenous peoples cleared large areas for cropland. These fields in New England sometimes covered hundreds of acres. Colonists in Virginia noted thousands of acres under cultivation by Native Americans.

Native Americans commonly used tools such as the hoe, maul, and dibber. The hoe was the main tool used to till the land and prepare it for planting; then it was used for weeding. The first versions were made out of wood and stone. When the settlers brought iron, Native Americans switched to iron hoes and hatchets. The dibber was a digging stick, used to plant the seed. Once the plants were harvested, women prepared the produce for eating. They used the maul to grind the corn into mash. It was cooked and eaten that way or baked as corn bread.

Religion

Traditional Native American ceremonies are still practiced by many tribes and bands, and the older theological belief systems are still held by many of the traditional people. Many Plains tribes have sweatlodge ceremonies, though the specifics of the ceremony vary among tribes. Fasting, singing and prayer in the ancient languages of their people, and sometimes drumming, and dancing are also common.

The Midewiwin Lodge is a traditional medicine society inspired by the oral traditions and prophesies of the Ojibwa (Chippewa) and related tribes.

Another significant religious body among some Native Americans is the Native American Church. It is a syncretistic church incorporating elements of Native spiritual practice from a number of different tribes. Some varieties also include elements from Christianity. Its main rite is the peyote ceremony. Prior to 1890, traditional religious beliefs included Wakan Tanka. In the American Southwest, especially New Mexico, a syncretism between the Catholicism brought by Spanish missionaries and the Indigenous religions is common; the religious drums, chants, and dances of the Pueblo people are regularly part of Masses at Santa Fe's Saint Francis Cathedral. Native American-Catholic syncretism is also found elsewhere in the United States. (e.g., the National Kateri Tekakwitha Shrine in Fonda, New York and the National Shrine of the North American Martyrs in Auriesville, New York).

The eagle feather law (Title 50 Part 22 of the Code of Federal Regulations) stipulates that only individuals of certifiable Native American ancestry enrolled in a federally recognized tribe are legally authorized to obtain eagle feathers for religious or spiritual use. The law does not allow Native Americans to give eagle feathers to non-Native Americans.

Gender roles

Gender roles can vary significantly between tribal nations, with patriarchal, matriarchal, and egalitarian traditions historically present among the over 500 federally-recognized tribes. Many tribes, such as the Haudenosaunee Five Nations and the Southeast Muskogean tribes, had matrilineal systems, in which property and hereditary leadership were controlled by and passed through the maternal lines. 
Others were patrilineal tribes, such as the Omaha, Osage and Ponca, where hereditary leadership passed through the male line, and children were considered to belong to the father and his clan. For this reason, when Europeans or American men took wives from such tribes, their children were considered "white" like their fathers, or "half-breeds".  Generally such children could have no official place in the tribe because their fathers did not belong to it, unless they were adopted by a male and made part of his family.

In most of the Plains Nations, men traditionally hunt, trade and go to war. The women have traditionally held primary responsibility for the survival and welfare of the families (and future of the tribe). Traditionally, Plains women own the home, and tend to jobs such as gathering and cultivating plants for food and healing, along with caring for the young and the elderly, making clothing and processing and curing meat and skins. Plains women have historically tanned hides to make clothing as well as bags, saddle cloths, and tipi covers, and have used cradleboards to carry an infant while working or traveling.

Several dozen tribes have been documented to practiced polygyny to sisters, with procedural and economic limits.

Apart from making homes, women have traditionally held many additional responsibilities essential for the survival of the tribes, including the manufacture of weapons and tools, maintenance of the roofs of their homes, as well as participating in the bison hunts.
In some of the Plains Indian tribes, medicine women gathered herbs and cured the ill.

The Lakota, Dakota, and Nakota girls have traditionally been encouraged to learn to ride, hunt and fight. Though fighting was predominantly the duty of men and boys, occasionally women fought as well, especially if the tribe was severely threatened.

Sports
 

Native American leisure time led to competitive individual and team sports. Jim Thorpe, Joe Hipp, Notah Begay III, Jacoby Ellsbury, and Billy Mills are well known professional athletes.

Team based
Native American ball sports, sometimes referred to as lacrosse, stickball, or baggataway, was often used to settle disputes, rather than going to war, as a civil way to settle potential conflict. The Choctaw called it isitoboli ("Little Brother of War"); the Onondaga name was dehuntshigwa'es ("men hit a rounded object"). There are three basic versions, classified as Great Lakes, Iroquoian, and Southern.

The game is played with one or two rackets/sticks and one ball. The object of the game is to land the ball on the opposing team's goal (either a single post or net) to score and to prevent the opposing team from scoring on your goal. The game involves as few as 20 or as many as 300 players with no height or weight restrictions and no protective gear.

Individual
Chunkey was a game that consisted of a disk shaped stone that was about 1–2 inches in diameter. The disk was thrown down a  corridor so that it could roll past the players at great speed. The disk would roll down the corridor, and players would throw wooden shafts at the moving disk. The object of the game was to strike the disk or prevent your opponents from hitting it.

Music

Native American musicians have occasionally found broader fame in more mainstream American music. Artists such as Robbie Robertson (The Band), Buffy Sainte-Marie, and Redbone have had success on the rock and pop charts. Some, such as Sainte-Marie, John Trudell, and Blackfoot have used music as political commentary and part of their work as activists for Native American and First Nations causes. Others, such as flautists Charles Littleleaf record traditional instruments with an aim of preserving the sounds of nature, or in the case of R. Carlos Nakai, integrate traditional instruments with more modern instrumentation. A variety of small and medium-sized recording companies offer an abundance of contemporary music by Native Americans and descendants, ranging from pow-wow drum music to rock-and-roll and rap.

A popular Native American musical form is pow wow drumming and singing, which happens at events like the annual Gathering of Nations in Albuquerque, New Mexico. One form involves members of drum groups sitting in a circle around a large drum, playing in unison while they sing together in their Indigenous language. Often they are accompanied by dancers in colorful regalia. Most Indigenous communities in the United States also maintain private, traditional songs and ceremonies, which are only shared within the community.

Art

Writing and communication

Native Americans in the United States have developed several original systems of communication, both in Pre-Columbian times, and later as a response to European influences. For example, the Iroquois, living around the Great Lakes and extending east and north, used strings or belts called wampum that served a dual function: the knots and beaded designs mnemonically chronicled tribal stories and legends, and further served as a medium of exchange and a unit of measure. The keepers of the articles were seen as tribal dignitaries. Another form of communication was the Wiigwaasabak, birch bark scrolls on which the Ojibwa (Anishinaabe) people wrote complex geometrical patterns and shapes, can also be considered a form of writing.

A widely used form of communication was Plains Indian Sign Language (PISL), also known as Plains Sign Talk, Plains Sign Language and First Nation Sign Language. PISL is a trade language (or international auxiliary language), formerly a trade pidgin, that was once the lingua franca across central Canada, central and western United States and northern Mexico, used among the various Plains Nations. It was also used for story-telling, oratory, various ceremonies, and by deaf people for ordinary daily use.

In the late 1810s and early 1820s, the Cherokee syllabary was invented by the silversmith Sequoyah to write the Cherokee language. His creation of the syllabary is particularly noteworthy as he could not previously read any script. He first experimented with logograms, before developing his system into a syllabary. In his system, each symbol represents a syllable rather than a single phoneme; the 85 (originally 86) characters provide a suitable method to write Cherokee. Although some symbols resemble Latin, Greek, and Cyrillic letters, the relationship between symbols and sounds is different.

The success of the Cherokee syllabary inspired James Evans, a missionary in what is now Manitoba, during the 1840s to develop Cree syllabics. Evans had originally adapted the Latin script to Ojibwe (see Evans system), but after learning of the Cherokee syllabary, he experimented with invented scripts based on his familiarity with shorthand and Devanagari. When Evans later worked with the closely related Cree, and ran into trouble with the Latin alphabet, he turned to his Ojibwe project and in 1840 adapted it to the Cree language. The result contained just nine glyph shapes, each of which stood for a syllable with the vowels determined by the orientations of these shapes. Cree syllabics are primarily a Canadian phenomenon, but are used occasionally in the United States by communities that straddle the border.

Interracial relations
Interracial relations between Native Americans, Europeans, and Africans is a complex issue that has been mostly neglected with "few in-depth studies on interracial relationships". Some of the first documented cases of European/Native American intermarriage and contact were recorded in Post-Columbian Mexico. One case is that of Gonzalo Guerrero, a European from Spain, who was shipwrecked along the Yucatan Peninsula, and fathered three Mestizo children with a Mayan noblewoman. Another is the case of Hernán Cortés and his mistress La Malinche, who gave birth to another of the first multi-racial people in the Americas.

Assimilation

European impact was immediate, widespread, and profound—more than any other race that had contact with Native Americans during the early years of colonization and nationhood. Europeans living among Native Americans were often called "White Indians". They "lived in native communities for years, learned native languages fluently, attended native councils, and often fought alongside their native companions."

Early contact was often charged with tension and emotion, but also had moments of friendship, cooperation, and intimacy. Marriages took place in English, Spanish, and French colonies between Native Americans and Europeans. Given the preponderance of men among the colonists in the early years, generally European men married American Indian women.

There was fear on both sides, as the different peoples realized how different their societies were. The whites regarded the Indians as "savage" because they were not Christian. They were suspicious of cultures which they did not understand. The Native American author, Andrew J. Blackbird, wrote in his History of the Ottawa and Chippewa Indians of Michigan, (1897), that white settlers introduced some immoralities into Native American tribes. Many Indians suffered because the Europeans introduced alcohol and the whiskey trade resulted in alcoholism among the people, who were alcohol-intolerant.

As European-American women started working independently at missions and Indian schools in the western states, there were more opportunities for their meeting and developing relationships with Native American men. For instance, Charles Eastman, a man of European and Lakota descent whose father sent both his sons to Dartmouth College, got his medical degree at Boston University and returned to the West to practice. He married Elaine Goodale, whom he met in South Dakota. He was the grandson of Seth Eastman, a military officer from Maine, and a chief's daughter. Goodale was a young European-American teacher from Massachusetts and a reformer, who was appointed as the US superintendent of Native American education for the reservations in the Dakota Territory. They had six children together.

Slavery

The majority of Native American tribes did practice some form of slavery before the European introduction of African slavery into North America, but none exploited slave labor on a large scale. In addition, Native Americans did not buy and sell captives in the pre-colonial era, although they sometimes exchanged enslaved individuals with other tribes in peace gestures or in exchange for their own members.

The conditions of enslaved Native Americans varied among the tribes. In many cases, young enslaved captives were adopted into the tribes to replace warriors killed during warfare or by disease. Other tribes practiced debt slavery or imposed slavery on tribal members who had committed crimes; but, this status was only temporary as the enslaved worked off their obligations to the tribal society.

Among some Pacific Northwest tribes, about a quarter of the population were slaves. Other slave-owning tribes of North America were, for example, Comanche of Texas, Creek of Georgia, the Pawnee, and Klamath. There was heavily incentive by Europeans as a way of driving deeper wedges between Africans and Europeans as the Seminole Confederation had proved formidable. Slaveholding societies, like the Choctaw, were given highest privilege and respect amongst the Europeans and trade preference.

European enslavement
During the European colonization of North America, Native Americans changed their practice of slavery dramatically.  Native Americans began selling war captives to white settlers rather than integrating them into their own societies as they had done before. As the demand for labor in the West Indies grew with the cultivation of sugar cane, European settlers frequently transported enslaved Native Americans to the Caribbean to work on plantations. White settlers in European colonies established in the American South purchased or captured Native Americans to use as forced labor in cultivating tobacco, rice, and indigo on plantations as well. Accurate records of the numbers enslaved do not exist. Scholars estimate tens of thousands of Native Americans may have been enslaved by the Europeans, sometimes being sold by Native Americans themselves but often war prizes with Europeans, similar to what occurred in the aftermath of the Pequot War.

Slavery in Colonial America soon became racialized, including Native Americans and Africans but excluding Europeans. The Virginia General Assembly defined some terms of slavery in 1705:

The slave trade of Native Americans lasted only until around 1730.  It gave rise to a series of devastating wars among the tribes, including the Yamasee War. The Indian Wars of the early 18th century, combined with the increasing importation of African slaves, effectively ended the Native American slave trade by 1750. Colonists found that Native American slaves could easily escape, as they knew the country.  The wars cost the lives of numerous colonial slave traders and disrupted their early societies.  The remaining Native American groups banded together to face the Europeans from a position of strength. Many surviving Native American peoples of the southeast strengthened their loose coalitions of language groups and joined confederacies such as the Choctaw, the Creek, and the Catawba for protection.

Native American women were at risk for rape whether they were enslaved or not; during the early colonial years, settlers were disproportionately male.  They turned to Native women for sexual relationships. Both Native American and African enslaved women suffered rape and sexual harassment by male slaveholders and other white men.

Relation with Africans in the United States

African and Native Americans have interacted for centuries. The earliest record of Native American and African contact occurred in April 1502, when Spanish colonists transported the first Africans to Hispaniola to serve as slaves.

Native Americans were rewarded if they returned escaped slaves, and African Americans were rewarded for fighting in the late 19th-century Indian Wars.

While numerous tribes used captive enemies as servants and slaves, they also often adopted younger captives into their tribes to replace members who had died. In the Southeast, a few Native American tribes began to adopt a slavery system similar to that of the American colonists, buying African American slaves, especially the Cherokee, Choctaw, and Creek. Though less than 3% of Native Americans owned slaves, divisions grew among the Native Americans over slavery. Among the Cherokee, records show that slave holders in the tribe were largely the children of European men that had shown their children the economics of slavery. As European colonists took slaves into frontier areas, there were more opportunities for relationships between African and Native American peoples.

Among the Five Civilized Tribes, mixed-race slaveholders were generally part of an elite hierarchy, often based on their mothers' clan status, as the societies had matrilineal systems. As did Benjamin Hawkins, European fur traders and colonial officials tended to marry high-status women, in strategic alliances seen to benefit both sides. The Choctaw, Creek and Cherokee believed they benefited from stronger alliances with the traders and their societies. The women's sons gained their status from their mother's families; they were part of hereditary leadership lines who exercised power and accumulated personal wealth in their changing Native American societies. The chiefs of the tribes believed that some of the new generation of mixed-race, bilingual chiefs would lead their people into the future and be better able to adapt to new conditions influenced by European Americans.

Philosophy
Native American authors have written about aspects of "tribal philosophy" as opposed to the modern or Western worldview. Thus, Yankton Dakota author Vine Deloria Jr. in an  essay "Philosophy and the Tribal Peoples" argued that  whereas a "traditional Westerner" might reason, "Man is mortal; Socrates is a man; therefore, Socrates is mortal," aboriginal thinking might read, 'Socrates is mortal, because I once met Socrates and he is a man like me, and I am mortal.' 
Deloria explains that both of the statements assume that all men are mortal, and that these statements are not verifiable on these grounds. The line of Indian thinking, however uses empirical evidence through memory to verify that Socrates was in fact a man like the person originally making the statement, and enhances the validity of the thinking. Deloria made the distinction, "whereas the Western syllogism simply introduces a doctrine using general concepts and depends on faith in the chain of reasoning for its verification, the Indian statement would stand by itself without faith and belief." Deloria also comments that Native American thinking is very specific (in the way described above) compared to the broadness of traditional Western thinking, which leads to different interpretations of basic principles. American thinkers have previously denounced Native ideas because of this narrower approach, as it leads to 'blurry' distinctions between the 'real' and the 'internal.'

According to Carlin Romano, the best resource on a characteristically "Native American Philosophy" is Scott L. Pratt's, Native Pragmatism: Rethinking the Roots of American Philosophy, which relates the ideas of many 'American' philosophers like Pierce, James, and Dewey to important concepts in early Native thought. 
Pratt's publication takes his readers on a journey through American philosophical history from the colonial time period, and via detailed analysis, connects the experimental nature of early American pragmatism to the empirical habit of indigenous Americans. Though Pratt makes these alliances very comprehensible, he also makes clear that the lines between the ideas of Native Americans and American philosophers are complex and historically difficult to trace.

References 

Native American culture
Native American art
Native American topics
Indigenous culture in the United States